Peculiarities of the National Hunt is a 1995 Russian comedy film. It focuses on a young Finnish man named Raivo who dreams to analyze a classical Russian hunt so he engages with a group of real Russian hunters only to discover that his expectations about Russian hunting are very different from reality.

The film was written and directed by Aleksandr Rogozhkin whilst also being distributed by Lenfilm. It is a slapstick humor type of comedy and became a nationwide box office success almost immediately in Russia. It won the Nika Award and Kinotavr awards and was followed by several other sequel films with "Peculiarities" starting off each of their titles.

Background
The act of hunting in Russia has occurred for centuries. It first started with indigenous peoples of Russia. It became more common in the fifteenth and sixteenth centuries with many imperial hunts and hunting clubs taking place across Imperial Russia. The hunts would target a variety of animals but would in many cases they would hunt for wolves and bears.

Plot
The plot follows a young Finnish man named Raivo who is in Russia to study the mannerisms and details of a typical Russian hunt. He is taken in by a former Russian general, Ivolgin, and his band for a hunt in a rural Russian forest. The members of his band are quite eccentric in their own ways and one of them is an exceptionally outrageous woodsman called Kuz’mich.

Coming in with prior misconceptions of how the hunt will go about, picturing an eloquent and royal hunt akin to those of the Eighteenth and Nineteenth Centuries pre-Revolution Russia, but young Raivo quickly learns that this is far from his current reality, instead he finds himself in some rather boozy misadventures that take up much of this group's time.

They have many run-ins with many individuals in the area. Some of the events that transpired during these alcohol-related adventures include having a bear sneak into their banya and terrorize many of the main characters for a bit of time, a Militsiya officer loses his pistol, Lev blowing up a dynamite, missing cows, stolen Police UAZ's, and meetups with the milkmaids. Another side story occurs when Kuz’mich attempts to transport a cow to his relative in a bomber for a bottle of vodka. Stories like these, being stylized as traditional hunting tales, occur constantly throughout a vast portion of the movie and contribute to its slapstick humor elements.

As the movie progresses, it becomes apparent that the hunt is not the main event for these individuals and rather just something they will get around to eventually.

In contrast, Raivo envisions a hunt inspired by 19th century Russia where the hunt is well organized and requires the help of many people, hunting dogs, and horses to achieve a proper hunt. In this imaginary hunt, the characters speak French, are classy, and are after a giant wolf. These scenes serve to juxtapose the ideal hunt from the chaotic flurry that is occurring before Raivo.

But the group does attempt a hunt which is only found with odd events and findings. Some of these events include a pineapple being picked from a hedgerow, Earth being visible in the sky, and a missing cow thought to be shot down during the hunt coming to life and attempting to run away.

As the movie ends, the cast sits around a campfire, and the two worlds of the movie mesh to end the scene and movie.

Themes
The main theme in Peculiarities of the National Hunt is expectations vs. reality. The main character is met with disappointment when his attempt at a "Hunt" goes in a glaringly different direction than its historical predecessors. The film is filled with allusions and adaptations of folk tales about cases that could have happened during a real hunt. A set of Russian stereotypes was ridiculed: banya, vodka, bears. The film is full of paradoxical, anecdotal moments, which, although impossible in reality, nevertheless, in the context of the film, are perceived as authentic.

Generationalism is an important theme in the movie because it shows how serious the cultural difference in  the past was as opposed to the present. The movie goes to show that hallmark cultural events and activities may never go away but may be done or celebrated in a completely different manner with each generation. All the relationships of the characters in a grotesque form repeat the relationships in a certain Russian social group.

{{Blockquote|In Russia, everyone knows that "hunting" and "fishing" are just euphemisms of a completely chaste bachelor party in the fresh air, an alibi for men, each of whom has something from General Ivolgin and something from the Russian Buddhist Kuz’mich.|source=Mikhail Trofimenkov, Kommersant}}

National Characteristics is also a big theme in the film. There is a lot of camera work and direction that emphasizes the tradition of a hunt and it gives good insight into how the imperial past differs from the present. The imperial past and the post-imperial present are juxtaposed in a way that really contrasts the two time periods.

 Cultural meaning 
The filmmakers were able to guess the mood of the film so accurately, which will cause a response from the viewer, that the result looked almost like a social order. Aleksandr Rogozhkin had a reputation as an arthouse director. The era of Soviet cinema is a thing of the past, and Rogozhkin presented to the public, in fact, a new tradition of Russian comedy based on situations and techniques understandable to the modern viewer. However, the heroes — a kind of social "masks" (General, Huntsman, Policeman, Foreigner) — allow to draw a clear analogy with the Gaidai film comedy.фильм на сайте mega.km.ru   

After the release of the film, the actors who played the main roles became very popular with the audience. Alexey Buldakov, Viktor Bychkov, Semyon Strugachyov, Ville Haapasalo starred in sequels, became in demand in cinema, TV series and television advertising. Buldakov 's character has gained particular huge popularity for the ability to pronounce brief but capacious toasts.10 самых известных тостов Алексея Булдакова. 

In Russia the stable phrase "Peculiarities of national ..." is often used in the press, in literature.

Reception
 IMDB: 7.5
 Russian Film Hub: 7.5
 Kinopoisk: 7.7
 Letterboxd: 3.5/5

Being shot during the mid-1990s, when the number of films produced decreased sharply compared to Soviet times, the film was mostly well received in Russia and was a box office success. It caused a whole wave of imitations and borrowings in Russian cinema.

Critical reviews in foreign countries were a mixed bag of mostly positive reviews with some being partially negative. This may be attributed to a multitude of different factors, maybe involving differences in culture or difficulties in foreign distribution.

Box office release
The movie was released in 1995 as a comedy and garnered lots of attention which led to the making of its sequels, Peculiarities of the National Fishing, Peculiarities of the National Hunt in Winter Season, and Peculiarities of National Politics''.

Awards
 Karlovy Vary International Film Festival Nominee, "Crystal Globe", Aleksandr Rogozhkin in 1995
 Nika Award, "Best Picture" in 1996
 Nika Award, "Best Director" – Aleksandr Rogozhkin in 1996
 Nika Award, "Best Actor" – Aleksey Buldakov in 1996
 Nika Award Nominee, "Best Screenplay" – Aleksandr Rogozhkin in 1996
 Sochi Open Russian Film Festival, "Grand Prize of the Festival" in 1995

Cast
 Ville Haapasalo as Raivo the Student
 Aleksey Buldakov as General Ivolgin (simply Mikhalych)
 Viktor Bychkov as Kuz’mich the Jager
 Semyon Strugachyov as CID officer Lyova Soloveychik
 Sergey Russkin as Sergei Olegovich a.k.a Seryoga
 Sergei Guslinsky as Semyonov the Militsioner
 Sergey Kupriyanov as Zhenya Kachalov
 Igor Dobryakov as Nobleman
 Yuri Makusinsky as Hunter
 Boris Cherdyntsev as Commandant
 Aleksandr Zavyalov as Ensign
 Aleksey Poluyan as Detainee
 Igor Sergeev as Count
 Zoya Buryak as Milkmaid
 Saara Hedlund as Milkmaid

References

External links

1995 films
1990s Russian-language films
Films directed by Aleksandr Rogozhkin
1995 comedy films
Russian comedy films
Films set in Russia
Films shot in Russia
Films about hunters